See Me Not is the second album from German post-rock trio Saroos. It was released on Anticon in the United States and on Alien Transistor elsewhere in 2010.

The album is produced by Odd Nosdam.

XLR8R premiered the track "Yukoma" from the album on September 22, 2010.

Reception
See Me Not is listed as number 19 on the We Fear Change Top Albums of 2010.

Track listing

References

External links
 

Anticon albums
2010 albums